The women's heptathlon at the 2006 European Athletics Championships were held at the Ullevi on August 7 and August 8.

Biggest drama occurred on the first day as Eunice Barber, who was leading after high jump, had to stop because of injury. After that no one could challenge Klüft, who took first gold medal for hosts. Battle for silver was exciting to the end. Schwarzkopf was better than Ruckstuhl in 800 metres, but not enough.

Medalists

Schedule

Results

100 metres hurdles

High jump

Shot put

200 metres

Long jump

Javelin throw

800 metres

Final standings

External links
Results

Decathlon
Combined events at the European Athletics Championships
2006 in women's athletics